Muhovo may refer to:
 Muhovo, Sofia Province, Bulgaria
 Muhovo, Serbia in Novi Pazar